Millepora boschmai is a critically endangered species of fire coral. It was previously catalogued in two protected areas in Panama, the Coiba National Park and the Golfo de Chiriquí National Park.

This species was typically found in upper, forereef slopes to deep sand and rubble slopes but they were most abundant at the reef base and deeper outer slopes.

References

Milleporidae
Animals described in 1991